Cerro de las Ánimas ("Hill of the Souls", formerly known as Mirador Nacional) is a peak and the second highest point of Uruguay, with an altitude of 501 metres (1,643.7 ft).

Location and features

It is located to the southwest of the Maldonado Department, in the municipality of Piriápolis, in a similarly named range of hills which is named Sierra de las Ánimas.

Changing height calculations

Until 1973, this hill was considered the highest point of Uruguay. 

However, in that year, a group of scientists of the Servicio Geográfico Militar (Military Geographic Service) changed the measure of the Cerro Catedral, currently considered the highest point of the country, with an altitude of 513.66 metres (1,685.24 feet).

See also
Cerro Pan de Azúcar
Geography of Uruguay

External links
 Paseo Sierra de las Ánimas.

Hills of Uruguay
Landforms of Maldonado Department
Piriápolis